Josefov (also Jewish Quarter) is a town quarter and the smallest cadastral area of Prague, Czech Republic, formerly the Jewish ghetto of the town. It is surrounded by the Old Town. The quarter is often represented by the flag of Prague's Jewish community, a yellow Magen David (Star of David) on a red field.

History

Jews are believed to have settled in Prague as early as the 10th century. The first pogrom was in 1096 (the first crusade) and eventually they were concentrated within a walled Ghetto. In 1262, Přemysl Otakar II issued a Statuta Judaeorum which granted the community a degree of self-administration. In 1389, one of the worst pogroms saw some 1,500 massacred on Easter Sunday. The ghetto was most prosperous towards the end of the 16th century when the Jewish Mayor, Mordecai Maisel, became the Minister of Finance and a very wealthy man. His money helped develop the ghetto.

In 1850, the quarter was renamed "Josefstadt" (Joseph's City) after Joseph II, Holy Roman Emperor who emancipated Jews with the Toleration Edict in 1781. Two years before Jews were allowed to settle outside of the city, so the share of the Jewish population in Josefov decreased, while only Orthodox and poor Jews remained living there.

Most of the quarter was demolished between 1893 and 1913 as part of an initiative to model the city on Paris. What was left were only six synagogues, the old cemetery, and the Old Jewish Town Hall (now all part of the Jewish Museum in Prague and described below).

Currently Josefov is overbuilt with buildings from the beginning of the 20th century, so it is difficult to appreciate exactly what the old quarter was like when it was reputed to have over 18,000 inhabitants. Medieval Josefov is depicted in the 1920 film The Golem, composed of cramped, angular, squinted buildings, but this impression is used purely to convey the expressionist nature of the film.

Historical sites

 Franz Kafka's birthplace.
 High Synagogue (Vysoká synagoga): 16th-century synagogue.
 Jewish Town Hall (Židovská radnice): 18th-century rococo town hall.
 Klausen Synagogue (Klausová synagoga): 16th-century baroque synagogue.
 Maisel Synagogue (Maiselova synagoga): 16th-century synagogue destroyed by fire, now used as a museum.
 Pinkas Synagogue (Pinkasova synagoga): 16th-century synagogue, now a memorial to Holocaust victims.
 Spanish Synagogue (Španělská synagoga): 19th-century synagogue with Moorish interior.
 Old Jewish Cemetery (Starý židovský hřbitov): 15th- to 18th-century cemetery. Europe's oldest surviving Jewish cemetery.
 Old New Synagogue (Staronová synagoga): 13th-century Gothic synagogue.
 Ceremonial Hall of the Prague Jewish Burial Society (Obřadní síň): 20th-century neo-renaissance hall.

Further reading
 Všetečka, Jiří; Kuděla, Jiří (1993). The fate of Jewish Prague.  Grafoprint-Neubert. 
 Prague City Tourism (2017). Prague: Jewish. Prague City Tourism.

Gallery

See also 
 History of the Jews in Prague

References

External links

Jewish Museum in Prague

Districts of Prague
Historic Jewish communities
Jewish communities
Jewish Czech history
Jewish ghettos in Europe
Tourist attractions in Prague